The Gufs are an American pop and rock band from Milwaukee, Wisconsin.  The band's latest album A Different Sea was released on October 17, 2006. Their first single from the album was "Beautiful Disaster", which was the #2 unsigned artist download in October 2006 at the website www.purevolume.com.

The Gufs are best known for their songs "Smile" and "Crash (into Me)".

To celebrate their twentieth anniversary in 2008, The Gufs played a series of four free concerts with the Milwaukee Symphony Orchestra in June.

History 
The Gufs began as an eastside Milwaukee band in 1988, with University of Wisconsin–Milwaukee students Goran Kralj and Scott Schwebel.  Kralj and Schwebel, roommates and teammates on UWM's soccer team, recruited Kralj's younger brother, Dejan Kralj (still in high school in Northwestern Indiana), and high school friend Tony Luna, to round-off the quartet on bass and lead guitar. The band took their name from a place where a baby's soul comes from before the child is born, a phrase used in the Demi Moore film The Seventh Sign. After a few years of playing local eastside Milwaukee bars, the band lineup changed, as Luna left in 1990 to pursue a career in sound engineering, opening the way for Marquette University student and Milwaukee native Morgan Dawley to fill the vacancy. The band soon gained momentum, performing more frequently throughout Milwaukee. The band also featured percussionist Brian Pettit on all of their albums up to their Atlantic Records Release of "The Gufs."  After the album release and tour, Brian left the band to pursue other interests.

The band took second place at a battle of the bands at Marquette University in 1991.

The band released several independent label records and gained increasing exposure nationwide on college radio before being signed by Atlantic Records. The Gufs' tour with Matchbox Twenty resulted in Rob Thomas singing backup on the song "Give Back Yourself" on their Holiday from You album. The band broke up in 1999 after being disillusioned with the music industry and after feeling like Atlantic wasn't promoting the album properly.

The Gufs got back together in 2006 and released the album A Different Sea. They released the song "A Beautiful Disaster" and went on a national tour. The Gufs have often played Summerfest throughout their career.

Members
Goran Kralj - lead singer
Dejan Kralj - bass guitar
Morgan Dawley - lead guitar and backup vocals
Scott Schwebel - drums

Discography

Albums

Live albums

Singles
"Smile" was included on the compilation CDs Sounds of the Leisure Class Records: Midwest Collection, and WIIL Rock 95.1 Live. "Smile" was also remixed into a techno trance song at one point in the late 1990s, and recorded acoustic "Give Back Yourself" was included on the compilation CD Aware Compilation, Vol. 7.

References

[ www.allmusic.com list of albums (caution:several release dates reflect major label re-release dates)]

American pop music groups
Rock music groups from Wisconsin
Musical groups established in 1988
Atlantic Records artists